Kent County Council in England elected every four years.

Political control

Leadership
The leaders of the council since 1973 have been:

Council elections
1973 Kent County Council election
1977 Kent County Council election
1981 Kent County Council election
1985 Kent County Council election
1989 Kent County Council election
1993 Kent County Council election
1997 Kent County Council election
2001 Kent County Council election
2005 Kent County Council election
2009 Kent County Council election
2013 Kent County Council election
2017 Kent County Council election
2021 Kent County Council election

County result maps

By-election results

1997-2001

2001-2005

2005-2009

2009-2013

2013-2017

2017-2021

2021-2025

References

External links
Kent County Council

 
Council elections in Kent
County council elections in England